James Colville was a footballer. His regular position was as a forward. He played for Newton Heath during the 1892–93 season, as well as for Annbank and Fairfield.

External links
Profile at StretfordEnd.co.uk
Profile at MUFCInfo.com

Manchester United F.C. players
Year of death missing
Year of birth missing
English footballers
Association football forwards